Plotinus (Plōtînos;  – 270 CE) was a philosopher in the Hellenistic tradition, born and raised in Roman Egypt. Plotinus is regarded by modern scholarship as the founder of Neoplatonism. His teacher was the self-taught philosopher Ammonius Saccas, who belonged to the Platonic tradition. Historians of the 19th century invented the term "neoplatonism" and applied it to refer to Plotinus and his philosophy, which was vastly influential during Late Antiquity, the Middle Ages, and the Renaissance. Much of the biographical information about Plotinus comes from Porphyry's preface to his edition of Plotinus' most notable literary work, The Enneads. In his metaphysical writings, Plotinus described three fundamental principles: the One, the Intellect, and the Soul. His works have inspired centuries of Pagan, Jewish, Christian, Gnostic, and Islamic metaphysicians and mystics, including developing precepts that influence mainstream theological concepts within religions, such as his work on duality of the One in two metaphysical states.

Biography 
Porphyry reported that Plotinus was sixty-six years old when he died in 270 CE, the second year of the reign of the Roman Emperor Claudius II, thus giving us the year of his teacher's birth as around 205 CE. Eunapius reported that Plotinus was born in Lyco, which could either refer to the modern Asyut in Upper Egypt or Deltaic Lycopolis, in Lower Egypt. This has led to speculations that his family was either (Hellenized) Egyptian, Greek, or Roman. Historian Lloyd P. Gerson states that Plotinus was "almost certainly" a Greek. A.H. Armstrong, one of the foremost authorities on the philosophical teachings of Plotinus, writes that: "All that can be said with reasonable certainty is that Greek was his normal language and that he had a Greek education". Plotinus himself was said to have had little interest in his ancestry, birthplace, or that of anyone else for that matter. His native language was Greek.

Plotinus had an inherent distrust of materiality (an attitude common to Platonism), holding to the view that phenomena were a poor image or mimicry (mimesis) of something "higher and intelligible" (VI.I) which was the "truer part of genuine Being". This distrust extended to the body, including his own; it is reported by Porphyry that at one point he refused to have his portrait painted, presumably for much the same reasons of dislike. Likewise, Plotinus never discussed his ancestry, childhood, or his place or date of birth. From all accounts his personal and social life exhibited the highest moral and spiritual standards.

Plotinus took up the study of philosophy at the age of twenty-eight, around the year 232 CE, and travelled to Alexandria to study. There he was dissatisfied with every teacher he encountered, until an acquaintance suggested he listen to the ideas of the self-taught Platonist philosopher Ammonius Saccas. Upon hearing Ammonius' lecture, Plotinus declared to his friend: "this is the man I was looking for", began to study intently under his new instructor, and remained with him as his student for eleven years. Besides Ammonius, Plotinus was also influenced by the philosophical works of Aristotle, the pre-Socratic philosophers Empedocles and Heraclitus, the Middle Platonist philosophers Alexander of Aphrodisias and Numenius of Apamea, along with various Stoics and Neopythagoreans.

Expedition to Persia and return to Rome 
After having spent eleven years in Alexandria, he then decided, at the age of around thirty-eight, to investigate the philosophical teachings of the Persian and Indian philosophers. In the pursuit of this endeavor he left Alexandria and joined the army of the Roman emperor Gordian III as it marched on Persia (242–243 CE). However, the campaign was a failure, and on Gordian's eventual death Plotinus found himself abandoned in a hostile land, and only with difficulty found his way back to safety in Antioch.

At the age of forty, during the reign of Emperor Philip the Arab, he came to Rome, where he stayed for most of the remainder of his life. There he attracted a number of students. His innermost circle included Porphyry, Amelius Gentilianus of Tuscany, the Senator Castricius Firmus, and Eustochius of Alexandria, a doctor who devoted himself to learning from Plotinus and attending to him until his death. Other students included: Zethos, an Arab by ancestry who died before Plotinus, leaving him a legacy and some land; Zoticus, a critic and poet; Paulinus, a doctor of Scythopolis; and Serapion from Alexandria. He had students amongst the Roman Senate beside Castricius, such as Marcellus Orontius, Sabinillus, and Rogantianus. Women were also numbered amongst his students, including Gemina, in whose house he lived during his residence in Rome, and her daughter, also Gemina; and Amphiclea, the wife of Ariston the son of Iamblichus. Finally, Plotinus was a correspondent of the philosopher Cassius Longinus.

Later life 

While in Rome Plotinus also gained the respect of the Emperor Gallienus and his wife Salonina. At one point Plotinus attempted to interest Gallienus in rebuilding an abandoned settlement in Campania, known as the 'City of Philosophers', where the inhabitants would live under the constitution set out in Plato's Laws. An Imperial subsidy was never granted, for reasons unknown to Porphyry, who reports the incident.

Plotinus subsequently went to live in Sicily. He spent his final days in seclusion on an estate in Campania which his friend Zethos had bequeathed him. According to the account of Eustochius, who attended him at the end, Plotinus' final words were: "Try to raise the divine in yourselves to the divine in the all." Eustochius records that a snake crept under the bed where Plotinus lay, and slipped away through a hole in the wall; at the same moment the philosopher died.

Plotinus wrote the essays that became the Enneads (from Greek ἐννέα (ennéa), or group of nine) over a period of several years from c. 253 CE until a few months before his death seventeen years later. Porphyry makes note that the Enneads, before being compiled and arranged by himself, were merely the enormous collection of notes and essays which Plotinus used in his lectures and debates, rather than a formal book. Plotinus was unable to revise his own work due to his poor eyesight, yet his writings required extensive editing, according to Porphyry: his master's handwriting was atrocious, he did not properly separate his words, and he cared little for niceties of spelling. Plotinus intensely disliked the editorial process, and turned the task to Porphyry, who polished and edited them into their modern form.

Major ideas

The One 

Plotinus taught that there is a supreme, totally transcendent "One", containing no division, multiplicity, or distinction; beyond all categories of being and non-being. His "One" "cannot be any existing thing", nor is it merely the sum of all things (compare the Stoic doctrine of disbelief in non-material existence), but "is prior to all existents". Plotinus identified his "One" with the concept of 'Good' and the principle of 'Beauty'. (I.6.9)

His "One" concept encompassed thinker and object. Even the self-contemplating intelligence (the noesis of the nous) must contain duality. "Once you have uttered 'The Good,' add no further thought: by any addition, and in proportion to that addition, you introduce a deficiency." (III.8.11) Plotinus denies sentience, self-awareness or any other action (ergon) to the One (τὸ Ἕν, to hen; V.6.6). Rather, if we insist on describing it further, we must call the One a sheer potentiality (dynamis) without which nothing could exist. (III.8.10) As Plotinus explains in both places and elsewhere (e.g. V.6.3), it is impossible for the One to be Being or a self-aware Creator God. At (V.6.4), Plotinus compared the One to "light", the Divine Intellect/Nous (Νοῦς, Nous; first will towards Good) to the "Sun", and lastly the Soul (Ψυχή, Psyche) to the "Moon" whose light is merely a "derivative conglomeration of light from the 'Sun'". The first light could exist without any celestial body.

The One, being beyond all attributes including being and non-being, is the source of the world—but not through any act of creation, willful or otherwise, since activity cannot be ascribed to the unchangeable, immutable One. Plotinus argues instead that the multiple cannot exist without the simple. The "less perfect" must, of necessity, "emanate", or issue forth, from the "perfect" or "more perfect". Thus, all of "creation" emanates from the One in succeeding stages of lesser and lesser perfection. These stages are not temporally isolated, but occur throughout time as a constant process.

The One is not just an intellectual concept but something that can be experienced, an experience where one goes beyond all multiplicity. Plotinus writes, "We ought not even to say that he will see, but he will be that which he sees, if indeed it is possible any longer to distinguish between seer and seen, and not boldly to affirm that the two are one."

Emanation by the One 
Superficially considered, Plotinus seems to offer an alternative to the orthodox Christian notion of creation ex nihilo (out of nothing), although Plotinus never mentions Christianity in any of his works. The metaphysics of emanation (ἀπορροή aporrhoe (ΙΙ.3.2) or ἀπόρροια aporrhoia (II.3.11)), however, just like the metaphysics of Creation, confirms the absolute transcendence of the One or of the Divine, as the source of the Being of all things that yet remains transcendent of them in its own nature; the One is in no way affected or diminished by these emanations, just as the Christian God in no way is affected by some sort of exterior "nothingness". Plotinus, using a venerable analogy that would become crucial for the (largely neoplatonic) metaphysics of developed Christian thought, likens the One to the Sun which emanates light indiscriminately without thereby diminishing itself, or reflection in a mirror which in no way diminishes or otherwise alters the object being reflected.

The first emanation is Nous (Divine Mind, Logos, Order, Thought, Reason), identified metaphorically with the Demiurge in Plato's Timaeus. It is the first Will toward Good. From Nous proceeds the World Soul, which Plotinus subdivides into upper and lower, identifying the lower aspect of Soul with nature. From the world soul proceeds individual human souls, and finally, matter, at the lowest level of being and thus the least perfected level of the cosmos. Plotinus asserted the ultimately divine nature of material creation since it ultimately derives from the One, through the mediums of Nous and the world soul. It is by the Good or through beauty that we recognize the One, in material things and then in the Forms. (I.6.6 and I.6.9)

The essentially devotional nature of Plotinus' philosophy may be further illustrated by his concept of attaining ecstatic union with the One (henosis). Porphyry relates that Plotinus attained such a union four times during the years he knew him. This may be related to enlightenment, realisation, liberation, and other concepts of mystical union common to many Eastern and Western traditions.

The true human and happiness 

Authentic human happiness for Plotinus consists of the true human identifying with that which is the best in the universe. Because happiness is beyond anything physical, Plotinus stresses the point that worldly fortune does not control true human happiness, and thus “… there exists no single human being that does not either potentially or effectively possess this thing we hold to constitute happiness.” (Enneads I.4.4) The issue of happiness is one of Plotinus’ greatest imprints on Western thought, as he is one of the first to introduce the idea that eudaimonia (happiness) is attainable only within consciousness.

The true human is an incorporeal contemplative capacity of the soul, and superior to all things corporeal. It then follows that real human happiness is independent of the physical world. Real happiness is, instead, dependent on the metaphysical and authentic human being found in this highest capacity of Reason. “For man, and especially the Proficient, is not the Couplement of Soul and body: the proof is that man can be disengaged from the body and disdain its nominal goods.” (Enneads I.4.14) The human who has achieved happiness will not be bothered by sickness, discomfort, etc., as his focus is on the greatest things. Authentic human happiness is the utilization of the most authentically human capacity of contemplation. Even in daily, physical action, the flourishing human’s “… Act is determined by the higher phase of the Soul.” (Enneads III.4.6) Even in the most dramatic arguments Plotinus considers (if the Proficient is subject to extreme physical torture, for example), he concludes this only strengthens his claim of true happiness being metaphysical, as the truly happy human being would understand that which is being tortured is merely a body, not the conscious self, and happiness could persist.

Plotinus offers a comprehensive description of his conception of a person who has achieved eudaimonia. “The perfect life” involves a man who commands reason and contemplation. (Enneads I.4.4) A happy person will not sway between happy and sad, as many of Plotinus' contemporaries believed. Stoics, for example, question the ability of someone to be happy (presupposing happiness is contemplation) if they are mentally incapacitated or even asleep. Plotinus disregards this claim, as the soul and true human do not sleep or even exist in time, nor will a living human who has achieved eudaimonia suddenly stop using its greatest, most authentic capacity just because of the body’s discomfort in the physical realm. “… The Proficient’s will is set always and only inward.” (Enneads I.4.11)

Overall, happiness for Plotinus is "... a flight from this world's ways and things." (Theaet. 176) and a focus on the highest, i.e. Forms and the One.

Plotinus regarded happiness as living in an interior way (interiority or self-sufficiency), and this being the obverse of attachment to the objects of embodied desires.

Henosis

Henosis is the word for mystical "oneness", "union", or "unity" in classical Greek. In Platonism, and especially neoplatonism, the goal of henosis is union with what is fundamental in reality: the One (τὸ Ἕν), the Source, or Monad.

As is specified in the writings of Plotinus on henology, one can reach a state of tabula rasa, a blank state where the individual may grasp or merge with The One. This absolute simplicity means that the nous or the person is then dissolved, completely absorbed back into the Monad. Here within the Enneads of Plotinus the Monad can be referred to as the Good above the demiurge. The Monad or dunamis (force) is of one singular expression (the will or the one which is the good); all is contained in the Monad and the Monad is all (pantheism). All division is reconciled in the one; the final stage before reaching singularity, called duality (dyad), is completely reconciled in the Monad, Source or One (see monism). As the one source or substance of all things, the Monad is all encompassing. As infinite and indeterminate all is reconciled in the dunamis or one. It is the demiurge or second emanation that is the nous in Plotinus. It is the demiurge (creator, action, energy) or nous that "perceives" and therefore causes the force (potential or One) to manifest as energy, or the dyad called the material world. Nous as being; being and perception (intellect) manifest what is called soul (World Soul).

Henosis for Plotinus was defined in his works as a reversing of the ontological process of consciousness via meditation (in the Western mind to uncontemplate) toward no thought (Nous or demiurge) and no division (dyad) within the individual (being). Plotinus words his teachings to reconcile not only Plato with Aristotle but also various World religions that he had personal contact with during his various travels. Plotinus' works have an ascetic character in that they reject matter as an illusion (non-existent). Matter was strictly treated as immanent, with matter as essential to its being, having no true or transcendential character or essence, substance or ousia (οὐσία). This approach is called philosophical Idealism.

Relation with contemporary philosophy and religion

Plotinus's Relation to Plato 

For several centuries after the Protestant Reformation, neoplatonism was condemned as a decadent and 'oriental' distortion of Platonism. In a 1929 essay, E. R. Dodds showed that key conceptions of neoplatonism could be traced from their origin in Plato's dialogues, through his immediate followers (e.g., Speusippus) and the neopythagoreans, to Plotinus and the neoplatonists. Thus Plotinus' philosophy was, he argued, 'not the starting-point of neoplatonism but its intellectual culmination.' Further research reinforced this view and by 1954 Merlan could say 'The present tendency is toward bridging rather than widening the gap separating Platonism from neoplatonism.'

Since the 1950s, the Tübingen School of Plato interpretation has argued that the so-called 'unwritten doctrines' of Plato debated by Aristotle and the Old Academy strongly resemble Plotinus's metaphysics. In this case, the neoplatonic reading of Plato would be, at least in this central area, historically justified. This implies that neoplatonism is less of an innovation than it appears without the recognition of Plato's unwritten doctrines. Advocates of the Tübingen School emphasize this advantage of their interpretation. They see Plotinus as advancing a tradition of thought begun by Plato himself. Plotinus's metaphysics, at least in broad outline, was therefore already familiar to the first generation of Plato's students. This confirms Plotinus' own view, for he considered himself not the inventor of a system but the faithful interpreter of Plato's doctrines.

Plotinus and the Gnostics 

At least two modern conferences within Hellenic philosophy fields of study have been held in order to address what Plotinus stated in his tract Against the Gnostics and to whom he was addressing it, in order to separate and clarify the events and persons involved in the origin of the term "Gnostic". From the dialogue, it appears that the word had an origin in the Platonic and Hellenistic tradition long before the group calling themselves "Gnostics"—or the group covered under the modern term "Gnosticism"—ever appeared. It would seem that this shift from Platonic to Gnostic usage has led many people to confusion. The strategy of sectarians taking Greek terms from philosophical contexts and re-applying them to religious contexts was popular in Christianity, the Cult of Isis and other ancient religious contexts including Hermetic ones (see Alexander of Abonutichus for an example).

According to A. H. Armstrong, Plotinus and the neoplatonists viewed Gnosticism as a form of heresy or sectarianism to the Pythagorean and Platonic philosophy of the Mediterranean and Middle East. Also according to Armstrong, Plotinus accused them of using senseless jargon and being overly dramatic and insolent in their distortion of Plato's ontology."
Armstrong argues that Plotinus attacks his opponents as untraditional, irrational and immoral and arrogant. Armstrong believed that Plotinus also attacks them as elitist and blasphemous to Plato for the Gnostics despising the material world and its maker.

For decades, Armstrong's was the only translation available of Plotinus. For this reason, his claims were authoritative. However, a modern translation by Lloyd P. Gerson doesn't necessarily support all of Armstrong's views. Unlike Armstrong, Gerson didn't find Plotinus to be so vitriolic against the Gnostics. According to Gerson:

Plotinus seems to direct his attacks at a very specific sect of Gnostics, most notably a sect of Christian Gnostics that held anti-polytheistic and anti-daemon views, and that preached salvation was possible without struggle. At one point, Plotinus makes clear that his major grudge is the way Gnostics 'misused' Plato's teachings, and not their own teachings themselves:

The neoplatonic movement (though Plotinus would have simply referred to himself as a philosopher of Plato) seems to be motivated by the desire of Plotinus to revive the pagan philosophical tradition. Plotinus was not claiming to innovate with the Enneads, but to clarify aspects of the works of Plato that he considered misrepresented or misunderstood. Plotinus does not claim to be an innovator, but rather a communicator of a tradition. Plotinus referred to tradition as a way to interpret Plato's intentions. Because the teachings of Plato were for members of the academy rather than the general public, it was easy for outsiders to misunderstand Plato's meaning. However, Plotinus attempted to clarify how the philosophers of the academy had not arrived at the same conclusions (such as misotheism or dystheism of the creator God as an answer to the problem of evil) as the targets of his criticism.

Against causal astrology 

Plotinus seems to be one of the first to have argued against the then popular notion of causal astrology. In the late tractate 2.3, "Are the stars causes?", Plotinus makes the argument that specific stars influencing one's fortune (a common Hellenistic theme) attributes irrationality to a perfect universe, and invites moral depravity. He does, however, claim the stars and planets are ensouled, as witnessed by their movement.

Influence

Ancient world 
The emperor Julian the Apostate was deeply influenced by neoplatonism, as was Hypatia of Alexandria. Neoplatonism influenced many Christians as well, including Pseudo-Dionysius the Areopagite. St. Augustine, though often referred to as a "Platonist," acquired his Platonist philosophy through the mediation of the Neoplatonist teachings of Plotinus.

Christianity 
Plotinus' philosophy had an influence on the development of Christian theology. In A History of Western Philosophy, philosopher Bertrand Russell wrote that:

The Eastern Orthodox position on energy, for example, is often contrasted with the position of the Roman Catholic Church, and in part this is attributed to varying interpretations of Aristotle and Plotinus, either through Thomas Aquinas for the Roman Catholics or Gregory Palamas for the Orthodox Christians.

Islam 
Neoplatonism and the ideas of Plotinus influenced medieval Islam as well, since the Mutazilite Abbasids fused Greek concepts into sponsored state texts, and found great influence amongst the Ismaili Shia and Persian philosophers as well, such as Muhammad al-Nasafi and Abu Yaqub Sijistani. By the 11th century, neoplatonism was adopted by the Fatimid state of Egypt, and taught by their da'i. Neoplatonism was brought to the Fatimid court by Hamid al-Din al-Kirmani, although his teachings differed from Nasafi and Sijistani, who were more aligned with the original teachings of Plotinus. The teachings of Kirmani in turn influenced philosophers such as Nasir Khusraw of Persia.

Judaism 

As with Islam and Christianity, neoplatonism in general and Plotinus in particular influenced speculative thought. Notable thinkers expressing neoplatonist themes are Solomon ibn Gabirol (Latin: Avicebron) and Moses ben Maimon (Latin: Maimonides). As with Islam and Christianity, apophatic theology and the privative nature of evil are two prominent themes that such thinkers picked up from either Plotinus or his successors.

Renaissance 

In the Renaissance the philosopher Marsilio Ficino set up an Academy under the patronage of Cosimo de Medici in Florence, mirroring that of Plato. His work was of great importance in reconciling the philosophy of Plato directly with Christianity. One of his most distinguished pupils was Pico della Mirandola, author of An Oration On the Dignity of Man.

Great Britain 
In Great Britain, Plotinus was the cardinal influence on the 17th-century school of the Cambridge Platonists, and on numerous writers from Samuel Taylor Coleridge to W. B. Yeats and Kathleen Raine.

India 
Sarvepalli Radhakrishnan and Ananda Coomaraswamy used the writing of Plotinus in their own texts as a superlative elaboration upon Indian monism, specifically Upanishadic and Advaita Vedantic thought. Coomaraswamy has compared Plotinus' teachings to the Hindu school of Advaita Vedanta (advaita meaning "not two" or "non-dual"). M. Vasudevacharya says “Though Plotinus never managed to reach India, his method shows an affinity to the “method of negation” as taught in some of the Upanishads, such as the Brhadaranyaka Upanishad, and also to the practice of yoga.

Advaita Vedanta and neoplatonism have been compared by J. F. Staal, Frederick Copleston, Aldo Magris and Mario Piantelli, Radhakrishnan, Gwen Griffith-Dickson, and John Y. Fenton.

The joint influence of Advaitin and neoplatonic ideas on Ralph Waldo Emerson was considered by Dale Riepe in 1967.

See also 

 Antiochus of Ascalon
 Disciples of Plotinus
 Ecstasy in philosophy
 Emanationism
 Form of the Good
 Allegorical interpretations of Plato
 The One in Neoplatonism
 Pantaenus
 Platonic Academy
 Plato's unwritten doctrines
 Plutarch of Chaeronea
 The Theology of Aristotle
 Thomas Taylor

Notes

References

Bibliography 
Critical editions of the Greek text
 Émile Bréhier, Plotin: Ennéades (with French translation), Collection Budé, 1924–1938.
 Paul Henry and Hans-Rudolf Schwyzer (eds.), Editio maior (3 volumes), Paris, Desclée de Brouwer, 1951–1973.
 Paul Henry and Hans-Rudolf Schwyzer (eds.), Editio minor, Oxford, Oxford Classical Text, 1964–1982.

Complete English translation
 Thomas Taylor, Collected Writings of Plotinus, Frome, Prometheus Trust, 1994.    (contains approximately half of the Enneads)
 Plotinus. The Enneads (translated by Stephen MacKenna), London, Medici Society, 1917–1930 (an online version is available at Sacred Texts); 2nd edition, B. S. Page (ed.), 1956. 
 A. H. Armstrong, Plotinus. Enneads (with Greek text), Loeb Classical Library, 7 vol., 1966–1988.
 Lloyd P. Gerson (ed.), George Boys-Stones, John M. Dillon, Lloyd P. Gerson, R.A. King, Andrew Smith and James Wilberding (trs.). The Enneads. Cambridge University Press, 2018.

Lexica
 J. H. Sleeman and G. Pollet, Lexicon Plotinianum, Leiden, 1980.
 Roberto Radice (ed.), Lexicon II: Plotinus, Milan, Biblia, 2004. (Electronic edition by Roberto Bombacigno)

The Life of Plotinus by Porphyry
 Porphyry, "On the Life of Plotinus and the Arrangement of his Works" in Mark Edwards (ed.), Neoplatonic Saints: The Lives of Plotinus and Proclus by their Students, Liverpool, Liverpool University Press, 2000.

Anthologies of texts in translation, with annotations
 Kevin Corrigan, Reading Plotinus: A Practical Introduction to Neoplatonism, West Lafayette, Purdue University Press, 2005.
 John M. Dillon and Lloyd P. Gerson, Neoplatonic Philosophy: Introductory Readings, Hackett, 2004.

Introductory works
 Erik Emilsson, Plotinus, New York: Routledge, 2017.
 Kevin Corrigan, Reading Plotinus. A Practical Introduction to Neoplatonism, Purdue University Press, 1995.
 Lloyd P. Gerson, Plotinus, New York, Routledge, 1994.
 Lloyd P. Gerson (ed.), The Cambridge Companion to Plotinus, Cambridge, 1996.
 Dominic J. O'Meara, Plotinus. An Introduction to the Enneads, Oxford, Clarendon Press, 1993. (Reprinted 2005)
 John M. Rist, Plotinus. The Road to Reality, Cambridge, Cambridge University Press, 1967.

Major commentaries in English
 Cinzia Arruzza, Plotinus: Ennead II.5, On What Is Potentially and What Actually, The Enneads of Plotinus Series edited by John M. Dillon and Andrew Smith, Parmenides Publishing, 2015,  
 Michael Atkinson, Plotinus: Ennead V.1, On the Three Principal Hypostases, Oxford, 1983.
 Kevin Corrigan, Plotinus' Theory of Matter-Evil: Plato, Aristotle, and Alexander of Aphrodisias (II.4, II.5, III.6, I.8), Leiden, 1996.
 John N. Deck, Nature, Contemplation and the One: A Study in the Philosophy of Plotinus, University of Toronto Press, 1967; Paul Brunton Philosophical Foundation, 1991.
 John M. Dillon, H.J. Blumenthal, Plotinus: Ennead IV.3-4.29, "Problems Concerning the Soul", The Enneads of Plotinus Series edited by John M. Dillon and Andrew Smith, Parmenides Publishing, 2015, 
 Eyjólfur K. Emilsson, Steven K. Strange, Plotinus: Ennead VI.4 & VI.5: On the Presence of Being, One and the Same, Everywhere as a Whole, The Enneads of Plotinus Series edited by John M. Dillon and Andrew Smith, Parmenides Publishing, 2015,  
 Barrie Fleet, Plotinus: Ennead III.6, On the Impassivity of the Bodiless, Oxford, 1995.
 Barrie Fleet, Plotinus: Ennead IV.8, On the Descent of the Soul into Bodies, The Enneads of Plotinus Series edited by John M. Dillon and Andrew Smith, Parmenides Publishing, 2012. 
 Lloyd P. Gerson, Plotinus: Ennead V.5, That the Intelligibles are not External to the Intellect, and on the Good, The Enneads of Plotinus Series edited by John M. Dillon and Andrew Smith, Parmenides Publishing, 2013, 
 Sebastian R. P. Gertz, Plotinus: Ennead II.9, Against the Gnostics, The Enneads of Plotinus Series edited by John M. Dillon and Andrew Smith, Parmenides Publishing, 2017, 
 Gary M. Gurtler, SJ, Plotinus: Ennead IV.4.30-45 & IV.5, "Problems Concerning the Soul", The Enneads of Plotinus Series edited by John M. Dillon and Andrew Smith, Parmenides Publishing, 2015, 
 W. Helleman-Elgersma, Soul-Sisters. A Commentary on Enneads IV, 3 (27), 1–8 of Plotinus, Amsterdam, 1980.
 James Luchte, Early Greek Thought: Before the Dawn. London: Bloomsbury Publishing, 2011. . 
 Kieran McGroarty, Plotinus on Eudaimonia: A Commentary on Ennead I.4, Oxford, 2006.
 P. A. Meijer, Plotinus on the Good or the One (VI.9), Amsterdam, 1992.
 H. Oosthout, Modes of Knowledge and the Transcendental: An Introduction to Plotinus Ennead V.3, Amsterdam, 1991.
 J. Wilberding, Plotinus' Cosmology. A study of Ennead II. 1 (40), Oxford, 2006.
 A. M. Wolters, Plotinus on Eros: A Detailed Exegetical Study of Enneads III, 5, Amsterdam, 1972.

General works on Neoplatonism

 Robert M. Berchman, From Philo to Origen: Middle Platonism in Transition, Chico, Scholars Press, 1984.
 Frederick Copleston, A History of Philosophy: Vol. 1, Part 2. 
 P. Merlan, "Greek Philosophy from Plato to Plotinus" in A. H. Armstrong (ed.), The Cambridge History of Later Greek and Early Medieval Philosophy, Cambridge, 1967. 
 Pauliina Remes, Neoplatonism (Ancient Philosophies), University of California Press, 2008.
 Thomas Taylor, The fragments that remain of the lost writings of Proclus, surnamed the Platonic successor, London, 1825. (Selene Books reprint edition, 1987. )
 Richard T. Wallis, Neoplatonism and Gnosticism, University of Oklahoma, 1984.  and 

Studies on some aspects of Plotinus' work
 R. B. Harris (ed.), Neoplatonism and Indian Thought, Albany, 1982.
 Giannis Stamatellos, Plotinus and the Presocratics. A Philosophical Study of Presocratic Influences in Plotinus' Enneads, Albany, 2008.
 N. Joseph Torchia, Plotinus, Tolma, and the Descent of Being, New York, Peter Lang, 1993. 
 Antonia Tripolitis, The Doctrine of the Soul in the thought of Plotinus and Origen, Libra Publishers, 1978.
 M. F. Wagner (ed.), Neoplatonism and Nature. Studies in Plotinus' Enneads, Albany, 2002.

External links 

 
 
 
 Direct links to each Tractate of the Enneads in English, Greek and French.

Text of the Enneads
 Greek original (page scans of Adolf Kirchhoff's 1856 Teubner edition) with English (complete) and French (partial) translations;

Online English translations
 Plotinus, The Six Enneads, translated by Stephen MacKenna (with B. S. Page), at Sacred Texts.
 The Internet Classics Archive of MIT The Six Enneads, translated into English by Stephen MacKenna and B.S. Page.
 On the Intelligible Beauty, translated by Thomas Taylor Ennead V viii(see also the Catalog of other books which include Porphyry, Plotinus' biographer – TTS Catalog).
 Philosophy Archive: An Essay on the Beautiful, translated into English by Thomas Taylor in 1917
 On the First Good and the Other Goods, Ennead 1.7. Translated by Eric S. Fallick, 2011
 On Dialectic, Ennead 1.3  Translated by Eric S. Fallick, 2015

Encyclopedias
 
 

Bibliographies
 In English, by Richard Dufour.
 In French by Pierre Thillet.
 Plotinus' Criticism of Aristotle's Categories (Enneads VI, 1-3) with an annotated bibliography

 
205 births
270 deaths
3rd-century Egyptian people
3rd-century Greek writers
3rd-century philosophers
3rd-century Romans
3rd-century writers
Ancient Greek epistemologists
Ancient Greek metaphysicians
Ancient Greek philosophers of art
Ancient Greek philosophers of mind
Ancient Greek writers
Ancient Lycopolitans
Commentators on Plato
Egyptian philosophers
Neoplatonists
Philosophy writers
Roman-era Greeks
Ancient Roman philosophers